Julián Velásquez (born 7 December 1920) was an Argentine fencer. He competed in the team sabre event at the 1964 Summer Olympics.

References

External links
 

1920 births
Possibly living people
Argentine male fencers
Argentine sabre fencers
Olympic fencers of Argentina
Fencers at the 1964 Summer Olympics
Pan American Games medalists in fencing
Pan American Games silver medalists for Argentina
Fencers at the 1963 Pan American Games
Medalists at the 1963 Pan American Games